Fumero is a family name. Notable people named Fumero include: 

 David Fumero,  American  actor and fashion model
 Jorge Fumero, Cuban baseball player
 Margherita Fumero (born 1947), Italian actress and comedian
 Melissa Fumero (born 1982),  American actress